Richard Lietz (born 17 December 1983 in Waidhofen an der Ybbs) is an Austrian professional racing driver and a Porsche Factory driver. He has competed in such series as American Le Mans Series, Formula 3 Euro Series and the Rolex Sports Car Series. He is also a multiple race-winner in Porsche Supercup. Lietz was overall series champion in the 2007 International GT Open season with Swiss driver Joël Camathias. He has won the GT2 class of the Le Mans Series twice, alongside German driver Marc Lieb in both in the 2009 and 2010 seasons.

Lietz won the 2012 24 Hours of Daytona GT division driving a Magnus Racing Porsche 911 GT3 Cup with co-drivers Andy Lally, Rene Rast and team owner John Potter. He will compete in the FIA World Endurance Championship with Team Felbermayr-Proton. In 2015 he was crowned World Endurance Champion for GT drivers. Winning the title in a factory Manthey Porsche.

Racing record

Partial Porsche Supercup results
(key) (Races in bold indicate pole position) (Races in italics indicate fastest lap)

‡ Not eligible for points.

Complete 24 Hours of Le Mans results

Complete European Le Mans Series results
(key) (Races in bold indicate pole position; results in italics indicate fastest lap)

Complete FIA World Endurance Championship results

Complete IMSA SportsCar Championship results
(key) (Races in bold indicate pole position) (Races in italics indicate fastest lap)

References

External links
 
 

1983 births
Living people
People from Waidhofen an der Ybbs
Austrian racing drivers
Formula BMW ADAC drivers
Australian Formula 3 Championship drivers
German Formula Three Championship drivers
Formula 3 Euro Series drivers
24 Hours of Le Mans drivers
FIA GT Championship drivers
American Le Mans Series drivers
24 Hours of Daytona drivers
European Le Mans Series drivers
Rolex Sports Car Series drivers
Porsche Supercup drivers
FIA World Endurance Championship drivers
International GT Open drivers
Blancpain Endurance Series drivers
WeatherTech SportsCar Championship drivers
24 Hours of Spa drivers
Sportspeople from Lower Austria
Porsche Motorsports drivers
ART Grand Prix drivers
KCMG drivers
Nürburgring 24 Hours drivers
Porsche Carrera Cup Germany drivers